"Party in My Head" is a song by Swedish artist September. It's the second single from her fourth studio album Love CPR. It was released in Sweden on July 11, 2011 and in the US on September 27, 2011.

Background writing
The song was written by Wayne Hector, Lucas Secon, Daniel Davidsen, Peter Wallevik, and was produced by Lucas Secon, Cutfather, Daniel Davidsen, Peter Wallevik. The song was originally presented to Britney Spears for her album Femme Fatale, but rejected.

Critical reception
"Party In My Head" received  favorable reviews from most music critics. ScandiPop had compared the track a lot to Australian pop singer Kylie Minogue's singles Wow and Get Outta My Way. They said "it’s one of the best, simply because we love the message."
Allmusic compared the song to Rihanna's work with Loud. They said it "is the kind of crowd-pleasing, punchy and club-friendly".

Chart performance
Currently, the song debuted at number sixty on the Swedish singles chart on the issue date of 15 July 2011. After one week on the charts, it rose to number thirty-two. Its currently stayed in the charts for nine weeks. The song was mildly successful in the United States reaching a peak of 17 on the U.S iTunes Dance Charts.

Music video
The music video started filming on July 18th 2011 and was directed by Patric Ullaeus. The music video will be released when the single "Me and My Microphone" will be released, which was announced by September on her Twitter account.

Track listing
Digital download

"Party in My Head" (Radio Edit) – 3:50
"Party in My Head" (Extended) – 5:48
"Party in My Head" (Adam Rickfors Remix) – 3:40
"Party in My Head" (Adam Rickfors Extended Remix) – 7:05
"Party in My Head" (Punchy Remix) – 3:54
"Party in My Head" (Punchy Extended Remix) – 5:47
"Party in My Head" (Coucheron Remix) - 4:13
"Party in My Head" (Coucheron Extended Remix) - 6:15

Charts

References 

Petra Marklund songs
2011 songs
Songs written by Daniel Davidsen
Songs written by Lucas Secon
Songs written by Wayne Hector
Songs written by Peter Wallevik